John Lloyd Bale (18 January 1837 – 22 November 1885) was a banker and politician in Queensland, Australia. He founded a number of thrifts including what is now the Bank of Queensland. He was a Member of the Queensland Legislative Assembly.

Early life
He was born in London, the eldest son of John Bale and Hannah (née Lloyd) Bale. He immigrated to Brisbane on the Chaseley arriving 1 May 1849 with his parents and siblings. He married Eliza Slaughter on 4 August 1855 and they had three sons and three daughters.

Business
He initially worked in a hardware business but was insolvent in 1859. His circumstances improved and he went on to found a number of thrifts including the entity that is now the Bank of Queensland. He was chief executive of the latter until poor health led to his resignation in 1884.  His brother Benjamin Robert Bale succeeded as chief executive for about the next 20 years.

Politics
John Lloyd Bale was an Alderman of the Brisbane City Council from 1872 until 1884 and Member of the Queensland Legislative Assembly for Enoggera from 21 August 1883 to 13 October 1885.

Later life
Bale died 22 November 1885 and was buried in Toowong Cemetery.

References

1837 births
1885 deaths
Australian bankers
Australian chief executives
Queensland local councillors
English emigrants to Australia
Burials at Toowong Cemetery
19th-century Australian politicians
Pre-Separation Queensland
19th-century Australian businesspeople